Yengejeh (also Romanized as Yangjeh; also known as Yengejeh Pishkhar, Yengejeh-ye Pīsh Khowr, and Yengījeh) is a village in Pish Khowr Rural District, Pish Khowr District, Famenin County, Hamadan Province, Iran. At the 2006 census, its population was 546, in 160 families.

References 

Populated places in Famenin County